Raphael David Levine  (Hebrew: רפאל לוין, born March 29, 1938) is an Israeli chemist who is a professor at the Hebrew University of Jerusalem, and the Department of Chemistry and Biochemistry, University of California, Los Angeles and the Crump Institute for Molecular Imaging of the David Geffen School of Medicine at UCLA.

Birth and academic career 
Raphael David Levine was born on March 29, 1938 in Alexandria, Egypt. He is the Max Born professor of Natural Philosophy at the Hebrew University of Jerusalem and a distinguished professor at the University of California, Los Angeles.

Research 
Raphael D. Levine is known for his contributions in the modern theory of chemically reactive collisions and unimolecular reactions. He has played a major role in the application of the principles of quantum mechanics to the description of physical change in a reaction from a microscopic point of view, introducing many new concepts and terms which became standard to this area. His major works include the quantum theory of absolute rates, the first quantal treatment of molecular photodissociation, elucidation of the role of resonances in reactive molecular collisions, the theory of collision- induced dissociation, and the foundations of dynamical stereochemistry.

Awards and honours 

Raphael David Levine has received several awards and honours in his life.

 In 1968, he was also awarded the Annual Prize of the Academy.
 In 1974, he was awarded the Israel Prize, in exact science.
 In 1988, he was awarded the Wolf Prize in Chemistry along with Joshua Jortner of Tel Aviv University "for their incisive theoretical studies elucidating energy acquisition and disposal in molecular systems and mechanisms for dynamical selectivity and specificity".
 In 1992, he received the Rothschild Prize.
 In 1996, he was awarded the Max Planck Prize for International Cooperation.
 In 2001, he was awarded the EMET Prize.

He is a member of Israel Academy of Sciences and Humanities, the Max Planck Society, Academia Europaea, American Academy of Arts & Sciences, American Philosophical Society, Royal Danish Academy of Sciences and Letters, and National Academy of Sciences of the United States.

He has honorary doctorates from Liege University, 1991 and the Technical University of Munich 1996.

His 2005 book, "Molecular Reaction Dynamics", Cambridge University Press, has been selected by Choice as 'Outstanding Academic Title 2006'.

References

See also 
List of Israel Prize recipients

1938 births
Living people
Israeli chemists
Academic staff of the Hebrew University of Jerusalem
Wolf Prize in Chemistry laureates
Members of Academia Europaea
Israel Prize in exact science recipients
Israel Prize in exact science recipients who were chemists
EMET Prize recipients in the Exact Sciences
Members of the Israel Academy of Sciences and Humanities
Egyptian Jews
Israeli Jews
Jewish chemists
Foreign associates of the National Academy of Sciences
Fellows of the American Physical Society
Members of the American Philosophical Society